Skelpick  is a small remote crofting hamlet, 2 miles south of Bettyhill, in the far north of Sutherland, Scottish Highlands and is in the Scottish council area of Highland.

Populated places in Sutherland